Tatiana de Rosnay (born 28 September 1961) is a French writer.

Life and career
Tatiana de Rosnay was born on 28 September 1961 in the suburbs of Paris. She is of English, French and Russian descent.  Her father is French scientist Joël de Rosnay, her grandfather was painter Gaëtan de Rosnay and they were born in Mauritius. Tatiana's paternal great-grandmother was Russian actress Natalia Rachewskïa, director of the Leningrad Pushkin Theatre from 1925 to 1949.

Tatiana's mother is English, Stella Jebb, daughter of diplomat and former Secretary-General of the United Nations, Gladwyn Jebb, and great-great-granddaughter of Isambard Kingdom Brunel, the British engineer. Tatiana is also the niece of historian Hugh Thomas. Tatiana was raised in Paris and then in Boston, when her father taught at MIT in the 1970s. She moved to England in the early 1980s and obtained a bachelor's degree in English literature at the University of East Anglia, in Norwich. On her return to Paris in 1984, she was a press officer, then became a journalist and literary critic for Psychologies Magazine.

Since 1992, de Rosnay has published twelve novels in French and six in English. She has also worked on the series Family Affairs for which she has written two episodes with the screenwriter Pierre-Yves Lebert. This series was broadcast on TF1 during the summer of 2000.

In 2007, de Rosnay published her most popular novel, Sarah's Key. The book has sold over eleven million copies in the world. In 2009 the book was adapted into the French film Sarah's Key by Serge Joncour, with Kristin Scott Thomas as Julia.

In January 2010, several French magazines issued a ranking of the top French novelists, placing de Rosnay at number eight. In January 2011, Le Figaro magazine published a ranking of the top ten most read French authors. This collation positioned de Rosnay at fifth.

Published works

Novels
 L'Appartement témoin, 1992
 Mariés, pères de famille: Romans d'adultères, Plon, Paris, 1995. 
 Le Dîner des ex: Roman, 1996
 Le Cœur d'une autre, 1998
 Le Voisin, 2000
 La Mémoire des Murs, 2003
 Spirales, 2004
Elle s'appelait Sarah (trans. Sarah's Key), 2007
Boomerang, 2009 (trans. A Secret Kept, 2010)
 Moka, 2009
 Rose, H. d'Ormesson, Paris, 2011. 
 The House I Loved, St. Martin's Press, New York, 2012.  The main theme of this novel is Baron Haussmann's renovation of Paris and the consequences for the inhabitants of the areas to be reconstructed.
À l’encre russe, Librairie Générale Française, Paris, 2013. 
The Other Story, St. Martin's Press, New York, 2014. 
Sentinelle de la pluie, Héloïse d'Ormesson, Paris, 2018. 
The Rain Watcher, St. Martin's Press, New York, 2018. 
Les Fleurs de l'ombre, Pocket, Paris, DL 2021.  
Flowers of Darkness, Martin's Press, New York, 2021.

Short story collection
Son carnet rouge, 2014 (trans. A Paris Affair, 2015)

Nonfiction
 Manderley Forever: A Biography of Daphne du Maurier, St. Martin's Press, New York, 2017.

References

External links

 Author interview at Mother Daughter Book Club.com

1961 births
Living people
People from Neuilly-sur-Seine
20th-century French novelists
21st-century French novelists
French people of Russian descent
French people of English descent
Alumni of the University of East Anglia
Elle (magazine) writers
English-language writers from France
French journalists